Liolaemus anqapuka is a species of lizard in the family  Liolaemidae. It is native to Peru.

References

anqapuka
Reptiles described in 2020
Reptiles of Peru
Taxa named by Ling Huamaní-Valderrama
Taxa named by Aaron J. Quiroz
Taxa named by Roberto C. Gutiérrez
Taxa named by Alvaro Juan Aguilar-Kirigin
Taxa named by Juan Carlos Chaparro
Taxa named by Cristian Simón Abdala